Dan Simonescu (born Dan Simon; December 11, 1902–March 10, 1993) was a Romanian bibliographer and literary historian.

Born in Câmpulung, his parents were the civil servant Ion Simon and his wife Ecaterina (née Slăvescu). After completing Ion Brătianu High School in Pitești in 1921, Simonescu enrolled in the University of Bucharest. He graduated in 1925, earning a doctorate of letters in 1938. He attended specialized courses at Athens (1934) and Paris (1937 and 1939).

Simonescu became a substitute high school teacher in 1925, holding a permanent position in 1929-1931. From 1935 to 1940, he taught at a pedagogical high school in Bucharest. He worked as a teaching assistant at Bucharest’s Faculty of Letters and Philosophy (substitute, 1927; provisional, 1931; permanent, 1938). He was substitute professor at the Higher School of Archives and Paleography (1939-1941; 1942-1943) and substitute professor at the Letters and Philosophy Faculty of Iași University (1941-1942). In 1931, he became a librarian at the Romanian Academy library. He was chief scientific researcher at the Nicolae Iorga Historical Institute from 1952, professor at the Bucharest Pedagogical Institute from 1963 and then at the university, from 1969 until retiring in 1972. He was elected an honorary member of the Academy in 1992.

His first published volume was Încercări istorico-literare (1926). Other books included Viața literară și culturală a Mănăstirii Câmpulung (Muscel) în trecut (1926), Istorie literară în recenzii (1936), Romanul popular în literatura română medievală (1965), Teoria bibliografiei (1976) and Contribuții: literatura română medievală (1984). He scrupulously researched old Romanian literature in its cultural context, also making important contributions regarding 19th-century writers, particularly Mihail Kogălniceanu, whose works he edited.

Notes

1902 births
1993 deaths
People from Câmpulung
University of Bucharest alumni
Academic staff of the University of Bucharest
Academic staff of Alexandru Ioan Cuza University
Romanian literary historians
Romanian bibliographers
Romanian librarians
Romanian schoolteachers
Honorary members of the Romanian Academy